The 1991–92 Calgary Flames season was the 12th National Hockey League season in Calgary, 20th season overall for the franchise which was founded in 1972. This season represented the start of a new era for the Flames, as Cliff Fletcher, the only general manager the franchise had ever known, left the team to take up the same position with the Toronto Maple Leafs.  Doug Risebrough, Fletcher's former assistant, took over the reins for the Flames.

Fletcher quickly took advantage of his former team, orchestrating one of the largest trades in NHL history, a ten-player mega deal that saw disgruntled forward Doug Gilmour go to the Leafs, along with Ric Nattress, Jamie Macoun, Rick Wamsley and Kent Manderville for former 50–goal scorer Gary Leeman, Michel Petit, Jeff Reese, Alexander Godynyuk and Craig Berube.  The deal is often regarded as one of the most lopsided in NHL history, and helped transform both clubs, as the formerly inept Leafs quickly rose to contention, making two trips to the conference finals in 1993 and 1994.  The deal marked the beginning of the Flames' decline, which saw them ultimately bottom out by missing the playoffs for seven straight seasons between 1996 and 2003.

Prior to the season, the Flames lost defenceman Rick Lessard to the San Jose Sharks in the 1991 NHL Dispersal and Expansion Drafts.

The Flames finished fifth in the Smythe Division, seven points behind the fourth-place Winnipeg Jets and out of the playoffs. It was the first time the Flames had missed the playoffs since 1975, when they were known as the Atlanta Flames and their first losing season since 1982–83 This would be the only season that the Flames would miss the playoffs between 1976 and 1996.

Individually, three Flames represented the Campbell Conference at the 1992 All-Star Game: Forwards Gary Roberts and Theoren Fleury, and defenceman Al MacInnis.  Roberts' 53 goals tied him for third in the NHL, behind Brett Hull (70) and Kevin Stevens (54).

Fleury and MacInnis also represented Canada at the 1991 Canada Cup, winning the tournament. MacInnis was named a tournament all-star. Joel Otto and Gary Suter suited up for the Americans.

Regular season
On November 4, 1991, the Flames were shut-out 4–0 by the New York Rangers at Madison Square Garden. The Flames had not been shut out in a regular-season game since Sunday, February 26, 1989, when they lost 1–0 on the road to the Winnipeg Jets. Prior to their loss in New York, the Flames had gone 188 consecutive regular season games without being shut-out.

The Flames' penalty-killing struggled during the regular season, as they most power-play goals (107) in the NHL. They were also the most penalized team in the league, being short-handed 489 times.

Following an 11-0 blowout loss to the Vancouver Canucks on March 1, GM Doug Risebrough resigned as head coach and elevated assistant Guy Charron to the role on an interim basis. Unfortunately by that point of the season, it was too late to make the playoffs and the Flames went 6-7-3 following the change.

Season standings

Schedule and results

Playoffs
The Flames finished 5th in the Smythe Division, seven points back of the 4th place Winnipeg Jets.  As a result, the Flames missed the playoffs for the first time since their move to Calgary.  The last time the franchise had missed the post season was in 1974–75 when the team was still known as the Atlanta Flames

Player statistics

Skaters
Note: GP = Games played; G = Goals; A = Assists; Pts = Points; PIM = Penalty minutes

†Denotes player spent time with another team before joining Calgary.  Stats reflect time with the Flames only.

Goaltenders
Note: GP = Games played; TOI = Time on ice (minutes); W = Wins; L = Losses; OT = Overtime/shootout losses; GA = Goals against; SO = Shutouts; GAA = Goals against average

†Denotes player spent time with another team before joining Calgary.  Stats reflect time with the Flames only.
‡Traded mid-season

Transactions
The Flames were involved in the following transactions during the 1991–92 season.

Trades

Free agents

Draft picks

Calgary's picks at the 1991 NHL Entry Draft, held in Buffalo, New York.

See also
1991–92 NHL season

References

Player stats: 2006–07 Calgary Flames Media Guide, pg 120
Game log: 2006–07 Calgary Flames Media Guide, pg 138
Team standings:  1991–92 NHL standings @hockeydb.com
Trades:

Calgary Flames seasons
Calgary Flames season, 1991-92
Calg